John Eliot Thayer (April 3, 1862 – July 29, 1933) was an American amateur ornithologist.

Early life
Thayer was born in Boston, Massachusetts on April 3, 1862. He was a son of Cornelia Paterson (née Van Rensselaer) Thayer (1823–1897) and Nathaniel Thayer Jr., a banker who built Harvard's Thayer Hall. Among his siblings were twin brother Bayard Thayer (yachtsman and horticulturalist), older brother Nathaniel Thayer III (a banker and railroad executive), and sister Cornelia Van Rensselaer Thayer (the wife of New York State Senator J. Hampden Robb).

His maternal grandparents were Stephen Van Rensselaer IV (the 10th Patroon and 7th Lord of the Manor of Rensselaerswyck) and Harriet Elizabeth (née Bayard) Van Rensselaer. His paternal grandparents were Sarah Parker (née Toppan) Thayer and the Rev. Dr. Nathaniel Thayer, a Unitarian congregational minister from Lancaster, Massachusetts. Through his father, he was descended from John Cotton, the preeminent minister and theologian of the Massachusetts Bay Colony.

Career
After graduating from Harvard, he married and settled at the family farm at Lancaster, thirty-five miles west of Boston.  He became interested in ornithology in the mid-1890s, building up a collection which he housed in a museum in the main street of Lancaster.

He used his wealth to sponsor various natural history expeditions and in 1906 he sent Wilmot W. Brown to Guadalupe Island off Pacific Mexico. Here, Brown, H. W. Marsden and Ignacio Oroso gathered field data on how the natural vegetation was being destroyed by thousands of goats, to the detriment of the native wildlife. The native Guadalupe storm petrel was being predated by introduced cats, as was the Guadalupe flicker. Both birds became extinct shortly afterwards; several other taxa were found to be already gone in 1906. Thayer and Outram Bangs wrote an article in The Condor to draw attention to the situation.

In 1913, Thayer and other Harvard graduates sponsored an expedition to Alaska and Siberia, with Joseph S. Dixon and Winthrop Sprague Brooks as zoological collectors. A gull collected by Brooks on this trip was named Larus thayeri in Thayer's honour.

Thayer became ill in 1928, and donated his collection of 28,000 skins and 15,000 eggs and nests to Harvard. These included the first clutches ever collected of spoon-billed sandpiper and surfbird. After Thayer's death Harvard received his collection of 3,500 mounted birds.

Personal life
On June 22, 1886, Thayer was married to Evelyn Duncan Forbes (1862–1943), a daughter of Franklin Forbes and Martha Ann Stearns (née Cushing) Forbes, in Clinton, Massachusetts. After the marriage, they settled at the family farm at Lancaster. Together, John and Evelyn were the parents of:

 John Eliot Thayer Jr. (1887–1966), a delegate to 1928 Republican National Convention from Massachusetts who married Katherine Lee Bayard Warren, a daughter of Samuel Dennis Warren.
 Evelyn Thayer (1888–1980), who married Isaac Tucker Burr (1885–1972)
 Nora Forbes Thayer (1889–1988), who married Francis Abbot Goodhue Jr.
 Natalie Thayer (1894–1975), who married Lawrence Hemenway (1891–1966).
 Duncan Forbes Thayer (1900–1957), who married Priscilla Pinkney McHenry (1906–1975). After his death, she married Charles Winslow Farnsworth in 1963.

Thayer died on July 29, 1933 in Lancaster and was buried at Old Settlers Burial Yard there.

References

External links

1862 births
1949 deaths
American ornithologists
American people of Dutch descent
John Thayer
John Thayer
Harvard University alumni
John Thayer
John Thayer